G. V. Punchinilame was the 1st Chief Minister of Sabaragamuwa. He was appointed in April 1988 and was Chief Minister until April 1989. He was succeeded by Abeyratne Pilapitiya. His son is politician Susantha Punchinilame.

References

Members of the Sabaragamuwa Provincial Council
Chief Ministers of Sabaragamuwa Province
People from Ratnapura
Deputy ministers of Sri Lanka